Louis-Hippolyte Boileau (1878–1948) was a French architect.

Grandson of Louis-Auguste Boileau (1812–1896) and son of Louis-Charles Boileau (1837–1914, architect of the Hôtel Lutetia), Louis-Hippolyte studied at the École nationale supérieure des Beaux-Arts in Paris under Gaston Redon. He is best known for his Art Deco.

Works

 annex to the Le Bon Marché department store, Paris, 1920s
 war monument, Longwy, 1925
 Pomone Pavilion for Bon Marché, for the Exposition Internationale des Arts Décoratifs et Industriels Modernes, Paris, 1925
 the Pagode de Vincennes, for the Paris Colonial Exposition, 1931, now on the shore of the Lac Daumesnil in Paris
 the new Palais de Chaillot at the Trocadéro, for the Exposition Internationale des Arts et Techniques dans la Vie Moderne (1937), with fellow architects Jacques Carlu and Léon Azéma
 additions to the Expositions Buildings at the Porte de Versailles, with Léon Azéma, 1937
 Hotel Plaza in Biarritz with Paul Perrotte, 1928

References

1878 births
1948 deaths
Architects from Paris
20th-century French architects